Ryslinge Folk High School is a folk high school in the village of  Ryslinge on the Danish island Funen.

History
It was founded in 1851 by Christen Mikkelsen Kold (1816-1870) and was one of the first folk high schools in the world. Kold and Anders Christian Poulsen Dal (1826-99) were the first teachers. The college became a center for public education and general education. The high school has a focus on theater, acting and performing arts.

References

External links
  Ryslinge Højskole website

Folk high schools in Denmark
Secondary schools in Denmark
Educational institutions established in 1851